Bright Okpocha (born 14 September 1978 in Lagos State), better known by his stage name Basketmouth, is a Nigerian comedian and actor. He has organized popular stand-up comedy concerts like Basketmouth Uncensored across the globe.

Basketmouth hosted a comedy challenge on Instagram, called the #TwoThingsChallenge which sparked an uproar from fans, after a young fan posted a video of him saying obscene things relating to sex, with a child in close view in the video.

He was a producer of "Ghana Jollof".

Biography

Early life 
Bright Okpocha was born in Lagos State but hails from Abia State, Nigeria. He completed his primary and secondary school in Apapa, Lagos and moved on to the University of Benin, Edo State to study for a degree in Sociology and Anthropology. He discovered his skill in drumming in 1991 followed by taking up rapping in 1994. He then formed a group called "Da Psychophats" which had 7 members and they started going for shows and rapping in 1995, however they broke up before releasing any material. He went on to form another rap group known as "Da Oddz" with his brother Godwin and Muyiwa Ola-Phillips: they performed a couple of shows but didn't break through as their brand of rap was not accepted in Nigeria.

Education 
Bright completed his primary and secondary school education in Apapa (Lagos, Nigeria) and then moved on to pursue a degree at the University of Benin where he studied sociology and anthropology with his brother Godwin.

Appearances 
In 2000, Basketmouth appeared in Lagbaja music video titled Gra Gra.

In 2005 and 2006, Basketmouth won the National Comedy Award and the awards for Best Stand-up Comedian of the Year.  He was nominated in the 2021 maiden edition of The Humour Awards Academy alongside fellow comedian Mr Funny.

Basketmouth appears in the Africa Magic show "My Flatmates" (2016).

Basketmouth recently hosted Nigerian Billionaire Femi Otedola in his home.

In December 2020, he started his comedy web series titled "Papa Benji".

Music
He launched a record label Barons World Entertainment in 2014.

He released a highlife album titled 'Yabasi' as a soundtrack for the movie 'Papa Benji' in November 2020. The album featured artists like Ladipoe, BOJ, The Cavemen, Bez, Waje, Duncan Mighty, Flavour and Phyno under Nigerian indigenous record label Freeme Music.

In 2022, he released the album titled Horoscope, which features guests artiste, Johnny Drille, Simi, M.I Abaga, Buju, Peruzzi, Oxlade, Reekado Banks, Flaz, Magnito, Illbliss, Dremo, and Flavour.

In May and December 2022, he produced concerts for Nigerian singers, Aṣa and Adekunle Gold respectively, under his Barons World Entertainment imprint.

Filmography 
Basketmouth has made plans and been reported to have made a short film Confession of a Bandit and has acted in the short movie as Agent Gburugburu with his mates taking on the other parts in order to make the movie complete.

In 2022, he featured in the hugely successful, Nollywood cinematic movie, The Brotherhood alongside Falz, OC Ukeje and Tobi Bakre.

Discography

Studio albums
 Yabasi (Onions) (2020)
 Horoscopes (2022)

Personal life
In November 2010, Basketmouth married his longtime girlfriend Elsie in Lagos, Nigeria. They share three children together. In December 2022, Basketmouth announced via his official Instagram account that he and his wife were getting a divorce after twelve years of being married.

Awards and nominations

See also
 List of Igbo people
 List of Nigerian comedians

References

External links 
 
 
 Exclusive Features on Basketmouth and other Nigerian comedians
 Basketmouth at www.takemetonaija.com

1978 births
Living people
Male actors from Lagos
Nigerian male film actors
Nigerian male comedians
University of Benin (Nigeria) alumni
Igbo comedians
Nigerian stand-up comedians
Nigerian film producers
Nigerian television personalities
Nigerian media personalities
Nigerian film directors
Nigerian male musicians
21st-century Nigerian male actors
Actors from Abia State
Nigerian television actors